Mineral Springs is a ghost town in Panola County, Texas, United States.

History
It was once a village of the Anadarko people. A small fort was built and the area was settled in 1833 by Daniel Martin. The spring water was used by settlers. In the 1870s, an African-American church was built there. A logging camp was established at Mineral Springs, and lumber was shipped on the Texas, Sabine Valley and Northwestern Railway. A flag stop operated there between 1888 and 1910. The church collapsed by 1948, and is now covered by woods.

References

Ghost towns in East Texas
Geography of Panola County, Texas